Ammakkorumma (1981) is an Indian film in the Malayalam language directed by Sreekumaran Thampi, starring Ratheesh, Jagathy Sreekumar, Zarina Wahab and Rajakumaran Thampi, Thampi's son. The Malayalam title literally means A Kiss for Mother.

Plot synopsis
Varghese, an employee in Vijayan's factory, passes away due to an ailment. When Vijayan goes to attend the funeral rites of Varghese, he finds that Varghese's wife is none other than his old lover.

Cast
Ratheesh as Vijayan
Jagathy Sreekumar as IPS officer Bhadran
Harikeshan Thampi as Varghese
T. G. Ravi  
Zarina Wahab as Sindhu
Kalarenjini as Sherly
T. R. Omana
Bhagyalakshmi as Radhika
Poojappura Ravi
Vijayaraghavan as actor Gopakumar
Poojappura Ravi
Rajakumaran Thampi as Rajumon
Aruna Irani as bar dancer

Soundtrack

References

External links
 

1981 films
1980s Malayalam-language films
Films directed by Sreekumaran Thampi
Films scored by Shyam (composer)